Harda is a town and a municipality in Harda district in the Indian state of Madhya Pradesh. Harda is the administrative headquarters of Harda.

History

Mughal period
During the Mughal period, Harda was a mahal in the Handia sarkar. In 1742, Marathas led by Peshwa Balaji Baji Rao captured the area, and displaced the Muslim governor of the Handia sarkar. Subsequently, Harda replaced Handia as the most important town in the area, as the local Maratha amil (chief) resided at Harda. Harda was a part of the Scindia's territories. In 1801, Yashwantrao Holkar sacked Harda. Later, Harda also faced attacks from the Pindaris and the Korku tribals.

British period
In 1817, during the Third Anglo-Maratha War, Harda became the headquarters of John Malcolm's division. Even after the Maratha defeat in the war, the Scindias retained control of the Harda-Handia tract. The area was ceded to the British in 1844, but the cession was completed only in 1860. The town saw disturbances during the 1857 uprising. The Deputy Magistrate, Maulvi Mazhar-ul-Jamil, helped curb the rebellion, and was rewarded with a jagir in the Damoh district. The Harda Nagar Palika was established on 18 May 1867, and the Harda tehsil was created in 1913.

The British tried to bring a progressive frame work to Harda during its rule. Harda was formed by combining Kul Harda and Mehmudabad Villages. After the railway lines were laid the conditions improved, and the area developed. In 1857 British officers worked here as judges and administrative Officers. Harda was one of the largest places in the old 'Madhya Prant' and includes area of 'Seoni Malwa.' The Harda language and culture is influenced by 'Malwa' and 'Nimar'. The main dialect spoken in Harda is known as Bhuani, and the region is known as the Bhuana area which loosely translates to more fertilized land.

Indian independence movement 

Guru Radha Kishan was born in 1925 in Bid village of Harda district. On 15 August 1947, S.D.O Shri Beretha hosted the Indian flag at the police station of Harda. Eminent personalities from Harda include Narayanrao Raghunathrao Kekre, the President of the Hindu Mahasabha of Madhya Pradesh.

Freedom struggle at Harda was led by Atmaram Lokre shastri in 1905. After the division of Bengal in 1905 there were political movements in Harda led by Pro. Mahadev Shivram Gole, Pandit Chandragopal Gajadharprasad Mishra (Vakil Saheb), Balwantrao Agnihotri, Bhikaji Vinayak Naik, 
Pandit Chandragopal Mishra, Ramdada Naik, Benimadhav Awasthi led the freedom movement. 
Later Thakur Guljarsingh, Sitacharan Dixit, Dadabhai Naik, Maheshdatt Mishra (son of Pt. Chandrgopal Mishra) & Champlal Sokal led the freedom struggle and were subsequently sent to jail. Prof. Maheshdatt Mishra spent 4 years in British Jails. He was personal Assistant to Mahatma Gandhi during turmoil years of 1942 "Quit India" Movement.

Geography
It has an average elevation of 296 metres (971 feet).coor title dm|22|20|N|77|06|E|region:IN_type:city

Flora and fauna
In the southern hill regions of Harda we can find the Tribal, 'Gond' and 'Korku' people. The south region of Harda was under 'Makdae' rule and the 'Gond' king was the ruler. The 'Bichhola' village of harda was the developed 'Rajaswa' center in the Mughal empire.
The area which was called 'Gondwana' became non-tribal (it is still tribal because there is a vast tribal population) during the British rule, as the workers, administration officials, farmers and business community was in touch with the states like Maharashtra, Rajasthan, Uttar Pradesh and Gujarat for a 150 years the area got influenced by the culture of these states.

Demographics
As of 2011 Indian Census, Harda had a total population of 68,162, of which 34,970 were males and 33,192 were females. Population within the age group of 0 to 6 years was 8,205. The total number of literates in Harda was 52,771, which constituted 77.4% of the population with male literacy of 80.9% and female literacy of 73.7%. The effective literacy rate of 7+ population of Harda was 88.0%, with male literacy rate of 92.3% and female literacy rate of 83.5%. The Scheduled Castes and Scheduled Tribes population was 8,758 and 2,390 respectively. Harda had 13493 households in 2011.

 India census, Harda had a population of 61,712. Males constitute 52% of the population and females 49%. Harda has an average literacy rate of 73.6%, male literacy is 79.7%, and female literacy is 66.7%. In Harda, 14% of the population is under 6 years of age.

Government and politics

Civic administration
On 18 May 1867 British established the 'Nagar Palika' in Harda and from 1920 the work was done as per the republic manner. The under ground drainage in Harda is best example of the British architect. For administration purposes Tahsil Harda was established in the year 1913. Harda was the headquarters of a tehsil in the Hoshangabad district. The Harda district was created in 1998.

Politics
Harda has as an assembly seat in the Madhya Pradesh Legislative Assembly with the same name, that is Harda and the MLA is Kamal Patel from the BJP.

Transport

Roadways

Harda city is well connected through road routes that connects various major cities of Madhya Pradesh and other states. Harda is located on Nagpur – Indore National Highway on National Highway 47 (India). Political capital Bhopal and financial capital Indore are about 165 Km and 150 Km from Harda respectively.

The Chief Minister Madhya Pradesh recently laid foundation stone for the following Road widening project in Harda:-
1) 40 Km of road widening work from Harda to Betul as four lane route located in (Chicholi-Betul) highway route in Nh-47 with cost of Rs 620 crores.
2) 30 Km of road widening work from Harda to Betul as four Lane route located in ( Harda - Temagaon) highway route in NH-47 with cost Rs 555 crores.
3) 47 Km of road Widening Work from  Indore - Harda as four Lane route located in (Namasa - Pidgaon ) highway route in NH-47 with cost Rs 867 crores.

Railways

Harda railway station comes under the Western Central Railway is connected by major route from Mumbai to Delhi and Mumbai to Allahabad.  Station Code is HD. The station has three platforms with all amenities available. It also has connectivity with Nagpur and also with Indore via Khandwa . The nearest Railway Junction is Itarsi which is 76 km from Harda.

Airways

Harda doesn't have airport. The nearest airport is Raja Bhoj Airport Bhopal which is 175 km from Harda and Devi Ahilya Bai Holkar Airport Indore which is 175 km from Harda.

Tourist attractions
 Handia : It is a famous pilgrimage spot and a sacred place situated around 20 km from Harda. The Narmada River flows and consists nabhi kund(centre of river Narmada ). There are also many temples dedicated to lord Shiva, out of which the famous temple built by Pandavas is also situated here. According to beliefs it was built during the Mahabharat era in a single night (6 months).
 Teli Ki Sarai - About 16 km from Harda in Handia, this structure was created in the 16-17th century by a banker for his customers to rest overnight. Historic records show that this was also used as a military cantonment.

Education
 St. Mary's School Harda
 Harda Degree College

Krishi upaj Mandi Harda
 Harda Mandi is one of the big mandis of Madhya Pradesh, where mainly crops like moong, gram, tur, wheat, urad, maize, soybean, mustard etc. are auctioned, harda mandi is the biggest mandi of the district. From here the daily prices of grains and vegetables being bought and sold in Harda Mandi can be seen. Special care is taken of cleanliness in Harda Mandi, so that the farmers who come daily do not face any kind of problem and they can get a clean mandi yard.

References

 
Cities and towns in Harda district